Nicolas Kanivé (23 November 1887 - 12 July 1966) was a Luxembourgian gymnast and athlete who competed in the 1912 Summer Olympics and in the 1920 Summer Olympics.

In 1912, he was a member of the Luxembourgian team which finished fourth in the team, European system competition and fifth in the team, free system event. In the individual all-around competition he finished 20th. Eight years later he participated as long jumper and finished 29th and last in the Olympic long jump event in 1920.

References

External links
 list of Luxembourgian gymnasts

1887 births
1966 deaths
Luxembourgian male artistic gymnasts
Luxembourgian male long jumpers
Olympic gymnasts of Luxembourg
Olympic athletes of Luxembourg
Gymnasts at the 1912 Summer Olympics
Athletes (track and field) at the 1920 Summer Olympics
Luxembourgian sportsmen
20th-century Luxembourgian people